The Butler's in Love is a short film directed by David Arquette and starring Elizabeth Berkley and Thomas Jane. The film is based on a painting by Mark Stock which hangs in Bix, the San Francisco restaurant where Arquette and his wife Courteney Cox held their rehearsal dinner the night before their wedding.

The work shows a butler holding up a glass which is smudged with lipstick and a bottle of absinthe on a side table. "We didn't have any absinthe at our wedding," Arquette said with a laugh. "But I never forgot about the painting. I think of the romance behind it."

The film was shot in 3-D  on location in San Francisco and premiered June 23, 2008 at Mann's Chinese Theatre in Los Angeles, California. The rest of the Arquette siblings attended the screening, as well as his wife Cox and stars Elizabeth Berkley and Thomas Jane.

 The Butler's in Love is the first of many short films from the new full-service film production company titled Tourmented Films.  French Absinthe brand Le Tourment Vert, in cooperation with Converge Entertainment, announced on June 23, 2008 the launch of their newest venture, Tourmented Films. Established to create edgy short films that carry the look and feel of the absinthe genre, Tourmented Films officially launched with The Butler's in Love directed by David Arquette.

Plot
The plot is based on the Mark Stock painting "The Butler's in Love". It concerns the romance between a butler and the wife of the host of a fancy dress party in 1912.

Cast
Thomas Jane as The Butler
Elizabeth Berkley as The Wife
Richmond Arquette as The Husband
Mark Stock as The Magician
Jenny Scheinman as The Singer
Celia de Blas as Dinner Party Guest
Kyle Scudiere as Patron
Bert van Aalsburg as Dinner Party Guest

3D Capture
This was the first production use of KernerFX's Kernercam stereoscopic 3D camera rig. When the project was brought to Kerner Studios, Kerner requested that a number of features previously considered 'tricky' for 3D capture be included in the film including fire, crystal glass and motion.

"Butler's in Love" was lensed by Peter Anderson, ASC, the famous 3-D Cinematographer that had originally designed the Kerner 3-D rig for his filming of "Godzilla 3-D".

References

External links
 

2008 films
American short films
2008 short films
Films set in 1912
Films directed by David Arquette
Coquette Productions films
2000s English-language films